National Highway 348A, commonly called NH 348A is a small national highway in  India. It is a spur road of National Highway 348. NH-348A traverses the state of Maharashtra in India.

Route 
JNPT, Gavanphata, Palm Beach Road.

Junctions  
 
Terminal with National Highway 348 near JNPT.

Terminal with Palm Beach Road.

See also 
List of National Highways in India by highway number

References

External links 

 NH 348A on OpenStreetMap

National highways in India
National Highways in Maharashtra